Wall Street: Money Never Sleeps (also known as Wall Street 2 or Wall Street 2: Money Never Sleeps) is a 2010 American drama film directed by Oliver Stone, a sequel to Wall Street (1987). It stars Michael Douglas, Shia LaBeouf, Josh Brolin, Carey Mulligan, Frank Langella, Susan Sarandon and Eli Wallach in his final film role.

The film takes place in New York City, 23 years after the original, and revolves around the 2008 financial crisis. Its plot centers on a supposedly reformed Gordon Gekko, played by Douglas, and follows his attempts to repair his relationship with his daughter Winnie (Mulligan), with the help of her fiancé, Jacob Moore (LaBeouf).

Principal photography took place in New York City between September and November 2009. After having its release date moved twice, Money Never Sleeps was released theatrically worldwide on September 24, 2010, by 20th Century Fox. Prior to its official release, many journalists connected to the financial industry were reportedly shown advance screenings of the film.

Despite opening to positive reception at the 2010 Cannes Film Festival, Money Never Sleeps received mixed reviews from critics. Though failing to meet its critical expectations, the film was successful at the box office, topping the United States's ranking during its opening weekend, and earning a worldwide total of $134 million in ticket sales, and more than $15 million on DVD.

Plot 
In 2001, former corporate raider Gordon Gekko is released from prison after serving time for insider trading and securities fraud.

By 2008, Gekko has begun promoting his new book Is Greed Good?, warning about a coming economic downturn. His estranged daughter, Winnie, runs a small, non-profit news website and is dating Jacob "Jake" Moore, a top prop trader at Keller Zabel Investments (KZI). Jake, a protégé of KZI managing director Louis Zabel, has been raising money for Dr. Masters and his fusion research project, which might create abundant clean energy. Jake is also financially assisting his mother, Sylvia, who has quit nursing to speculate in residential real estate.

In the early stages of the downturn predicted by Gekko, KZI's stock loses more than half its value. Louis Zabel tries to arrange a bailout for KZI from other Wall Street banks, but is blocked by Bretton James, head of rival firm Churchill Schwartz (Church), which KZI had refused to help during the dot-com bubble years earlier. Despondent, Zabel commits suicide by jumping in front of a subway train. A distraught Jake proposes marriage to Winnie, who accepts.

Jake attends a lecture given by Gekko and introduces himself. Gekko tells him that KZI's collapse started when James spread rumors of KZI having toxic debt. Jake and Gekko arrange a trade: Jake will try to reconcile Winnie's and Gekko's relationship, and Gekko will gather information to destroy James for his actions against KZI and for providing evidence against Gekko years ago. In revenge, Jake illegally manipulates the market by spreading rumors about the nationalization of an Equatorial Guinea oil field which Church has invested in. The company loses $120 million, but James gives Jake a job, impressed by his initiative. Jake further impresses James when he convinces Chinese investors to invest in the fusion project through Church.

Jake attends a $10,000-a-seat fundraiser with Winnie, buying a seat for Gekko to facilitate a "chance" meeting. Gekko confronts James about what he did to him and to KZI. James replies that no one cares what Gekko thinks anymore. Gekko also bumps into Bud Fox (Charlie Sheen), who, following his release from jail, turned Bluestar Airlines into a huge success, sold it for millions, and retired to play golf and become a philanthropist. Gekko follows Winnie outside, where she explains why she blames him for everything that went wrong, stemming from his affairs and her brother Rudy's suicide. Gekko claims he worked, from prison, to get the best therapists and even paid off a drug dealer to stop selling to Rudy, who died from an overdose. Winnie forgives him.

As the financial crisis accelerates, James and Church's chairman Julius Steinhardt advise federal regulators to buy their multi-billion-dollar subprime loans. As the real estate market collapses, Jake helps out Sylvia with his own money. Shortly after Winnie informs Jake that she is expecting their first child, Jake learns that James is diverting the Chinese investment into underperforming solar panels, which are not a threat to his large position in fossil fuels. Gekko soon informs Jake that James had secretly made huge profits betting against subprime loans yet still accepted the fed's massive bailout.

Gekko proposes using a $100 million trust account, which he hid in Switzerland for Winnie in the 1980s, to fund the fusion research. She signs the money over to Jake, not knowing he would entrust it to Gekko to complete the investment. When Gekko betrays them by leaving the country with the money, Winnie breaks up with Jake. Gekko sets up a hugely successful investment company in London, capitalized by the $100 million. Jake visits him to propose a new trade: Winnie gets her money back, and Gekko can participate in his grandchild's life. Gekko refuses.

Jake pieces together all the details of James's dealings, from KZI's collapse through to the unnecessary government bailout of Church. He gives the information to Winnie, telling her that revealing it will bring her website publicity and credibility. When Winnie runs the story, James finds himself under intense government scrutiny and is fired by his company's board, who then turn to Gekko's firm for a partnership, which recently posted a $1.1 billion return on investment.

Late one night, when Jake fails to make amends with Winnie, Gekko appears, apologizes and tells them that he has anonymously deposited $100 million into the fusion research account, convincing her to give both him and Jake another chance. One year later, Gekko, Sylvia, and other family and friends attend the first birthday party of Louis, Jake and Winnie's son.

Cast 
 Michael Douglas as Gordon Gekko
 Shia LaBeouf as Jacob "Jake" Moore
 Josh Brolin as Bretton James
 Carey Mulligan as Winnie Gekko
 Susan Sarandon as Sylvia Moore
 Eli Wallach as Julius "Julie" Steinhardt
 Frank Langella as Louis "Lou" Zabel
 Austin Pendleton as Dr. Masters
 Sylvia Miles as Dolores, The Realtor
 Vanessa Ferlito as Audrey
 John Buffalo Mailer as Robby
 Jason Clarke as New York Fed Chief
 Oliver Stone as Investor
 Charlie Sheen as Bud "Buddy" Fox
 Donald Trump as himself (deleted scene)
 Anthony Scaramucci as himself
 Maria Bartiromo as herself, Newscaster Cameo
 Becky Quick as herself, Squawk Box Host Cameo
 Jim Cramer as Cameo Appearance
 Ali Velshi as Cameo Appearance
 Waltrudis Buck as Annica

Characters 

Michael Douglas reprises his role as Gordon Gekko, which won him an Academy Award after the original film. Gekko has recently been released from prison and, after a failed attempt to warn business leaders of the imminent economic downturn, he decides to try to rebuild a relationship with his estranged daughter Winnie.

Shia LaBeouf portrays Jacob "Jake" Moore, an ambitious, young proprietary trader who works for Keller Zabel Investments, and is in a relationship with Winnie. LaBeouf's role in the film has been said to be a role similar to that of Charlie Sheen's in the original. The young actor said he was able to relate to his character's background and found similarities in their motivations. Initially the actor was intimidated by the idea of working on a film that was going to stretch his dramatic abilities and came to the film set with a different approach, which was that if he disappointed his fans twice, his career was finished after making two recently panned sequels.

LaBeouf stated that, during his first meeting with Stone, the director was "really expedient about killing any ego or conceit on my part", saying not to worry because Tom Cruise "was not an actor" when he first worked with him either, which LaBeouf considered "a knife to [his] heart". LaBeouf said that he did not know what a credit derivative is or what a CP, LP, or LVC were, commenting "You gotta know ticker names." He also said that he has "no concept" of the "ins and outs of the financial world" and, as part of getting into character, he chose to stay thin to be like hedge funders. To prepare for the film he traded with different firms, playing with up to $1 million, and became so interested in trading that he began studying for the Series 7 Exam.

Josh Brolin plays Bretton James, head of the Churchill Schwartz investment bank, whom Jacob blames for the death of his mentor. Bretton has been described as being a villain. Bretton is presented as a "new style" version of Gekko in the film. Javier Bardem was in final talks to play the character; in July 2009 it was confirmed that he had turned down the project in favor of a film adaptation of the book Eat, Pray, Love, with Julia Roberts. Brolin took the part and lost 30 pounds in a month to prepare physically for this part. The actor, acknowledging that every character had both good and bad in them, viewed Bretton as being on a "higher level," adding that he liked the ambition his character had and that he was an opportunist.

Carey Mulligan was cast as Winnie Gekko, Gordon's estranged daughter and Jacob's fiancée. Winnie has not spoken to her father since his imprisonment; she blames Gordon for the suicide of her drugged-out brother, Rudy. The character has been said to be the "moral center of the story" and described as being liberal, and to some extent passive. Mulligan is British and had to speak with an American accent for her role. Wall Street: Money Never Sleeps was her first major studio film. When she first met Stone for the role she explained that she did not want her character to be a "token girlfriend;" both agreed to work to make sure that would not happen. During the same encounter Stone learned that she had short hair, and he initially discussed having her wear a wig, but Mulligan said she did not feel like herself when wearing the hairpiece. Stone trusted her and made an exception. According to Mulligan, Stone cast her in the Wall Street sequel based on her performance in An Education (2009).

Frank Langella was cast as Louis Zabel. His death "ultimately leads the characters to discover the shady practices" of James's bank. Susan Sarandon portrays Sylvia Moore, Jacob's real-estate agent mother who is just as consumed by greed as Gekko is, but in a different sense. Audrey, a "tough, intelligent trader in the Wall Street trenches", is portrayed by Vanessa Ferlito. John Buffalo Mailer plays Jacob's Long Island financier friend, Robby and Eli Wallach plays the part of Jules Steinhardt, a Churchill Schwartz top executive and Wall Street patriarch who considers the current economic climate to be like the 1929 stock market crash. Pressman deemed the actor's role as the "crier of doom," who, "reveals just how much more devastating things can be today." Charlie Sheen reprised his role of Bud Fox, Gekko's former protégé, whom he meets briefly at a cocktail party. Sylvia Miles reprised her role as a real estate agent from the first film.

Television actress Natalie Morales, Vanity Fair magazine editor Graydon Carter, economist Nouriel Roubini, financier Warren Buffett and director Stone's mother have minor roles in the film. Jim Cramer also makes a brief appearance after Stone cast him because he was a former hedge fund manager. Stone, who had a cameo in the first film, plays a similarly brief role in Wall Street: Money Never Sleeps. He wanted to give the young LaBeouf "some older connections" that would "give it weight" in the movie. Donald Trump and Julianne Michelle played minor parts, but Trump's scene was cut from the final version (it is instead available on the DVD). Stone said the scene was too "distracting" for the ending. Program host Neil Cavuto appears in the sequel for several seconds. A longer scene that involved him was cut; a representative for Stone clarified that his decision was an aesthetic, not political, choice. Roger Hendricks Simon, a director-actor, landed a part acting as a thinly veiled version of former AIG CEO Hank Greenberg. Like Trump's part, his scenes were not included but are in the film's DVD version.

Production

Development 
In early 2007, The New York Times reported that a sequel to Wall Street, then tentatively titled Money Never Sleeps, had entered pre-production and was in the early stages of development with a screenplay by Stephen Schiff of The New Yorker. Shortly after the film was confirmed, Douglas was reported to be interested in reprising his role as Gordon Gekko, depending on the script. In October 2008, 20th Century Fox announced that it had officially green-lit the film and would serve as a distributor. In the same month it was announced that Allan Loeb had been approached to write a script that was being referred to as a "page one rewrite", meaning that he would be starting "from scratch". Shortly after the film had entered pre-production it was announced that both Charlie Sheen and Daryl Hannah would not be involved with the sequel for unknown reasons. Despite stating that Sheen was not going to return, Stone confirmed he would briefly reprise his role as Bud, which would be worked into the script.

Around May 2007, The New York Times reported that Stone had turned down the opportunity to direct the film, even after months of being pressured to do so by Douglas, among others. However, in April 2009 Fox confirmed that Stone would be returning as both director and producer, alongside Douglas and Edward R. Pressman. Stone stated that he reconsidered passing on directing the film after the stock market crash. The film was co-produced by Eric Kopeloff with Alessandro Camen and Celia D. Costas serving as executive producers. In addition to screenwriter Loeb, the film's overall writer is Schiff. Bryan Burrough received credit as a consultant, and may have done uncredited work on the story.

At the time of the film's announcement the plot details were kept under wraps, but Loeb later confirmed that its plot would primarily focus on Gekko, recently released from prison and re-entering a much more "chaotic" financial world than the one he once oversaw from the previous film. Its budget was reported to be between $60 million ($50 million with the tax credits) and $70 million. Money Never Sleeps was being used as the film's working title before being renamed Wall Street 2 at the director's request and finally changed to Wall Street: Money Never Sleeps. As part of research for the film, Douglas and Stone had a dinner meeting with Samuel D. Waksal, the founder of the bio-pharmaceutical company ImClone Systems, who spent five years in federal prison for securities fraud. LaBeouf, along with Stone, discussed the financial collapse with multiple hedge fund managers.

Early in mid-2009, Stone took LaBeouf to a party organized by Nouriel Roubini, a New York University economics professor and chairman of his own consulting firm. There, Stone and LaBeouf discussed the financial collapse with Roubini and also discussed hedge fund managers who were clients of Roubini's firm. Roubini said that "in this financial crisis it was the traditional banks and the investment banks that had a larger role in doing stupid and silly things than the hedge funds." Stone also said that he had conversations with Jim Chanos, a prominent hedge fund manager who had urged him to focus less on hedge funds and more on the banking system. Chanos said, "there was a much more important story, a bigger story, in what happened with the system."

Writing 
In October 2008, 20th Century Fox confirmed that Allan Loeb, who is a licensed stock broker, had been selected to re-write the script. Stanley Weiser had worked on a treatment for a sequel set in the present with Gekko being released from jail; the second part would be set in China. The studio felt that the material was dated, and put the project in turnaround. Stone had a falling out with Pressman, the producer, and began work on W. with Weiser. Weiser's treatment for Wall Street Two was discarded and the film began taking shape from an original script by Stephen Schiff. It was reported that Aaron Sorkin had turned down the opportunity to work on the film's script.

During December 2008, while still in the process of drafting, Loeb said that he had been riveted by the Bernard Madoff headlines and showed interest in referencing him in the film, noting: "the thing that is so crazy about this story is that Ponzi schemes seem to be the simplest low-class scam," and "but this was carried out in the highest echelon of high finance. You couldn't even get in to see this guy unless you had $2 million to invest." Stone clarified that Madoff will not be mentioned in the film, commenting that he considered Madoff's actions to be "a crook running a Ponzi scheme" which is "legal robbery." The filmmaker returned to the project in April on the strength of this script, feeling Loeb's draft was "so great" that he did not feel the need to touch it, although he did have the option.

Sometime in early June, Loeb reportedly handed in his second draft of the film to Fox, and in July, was finalizing the screenplay. Wall Street: Money Never Sleeps is based in four locations; New York, London, the United Arab Emirates, and an Asian country. One of the character consultants to the new film will be billionaire Vincent Tchenguiz. Pressman said that Tchenguiz had modeled Gekko but did admit that Gekko was "partly Milken" and that Gekko will be a more outwardly altruistic figure but, admits, "a leopard doesn't change its spots, despite appearances." Pressman said of the origin of the film's subtitle: "Wall Street was New York-centric. Today the markets are much more global, hence the title of the new film, Money Never Sleeps." He described Gekko's involvement in the film as being "larger than life".

It was reported that Loeb had taken advice from a "number of real Wall Street movers and shakers" to ensure "horrifying accuracy" for the film's script. Of the re-writes done to script, Stone said: "We sort of started over with the story of a young man who is at the center of it, and how he needs Gordon Gekko's help to navigate those waters." In a reference to the GEICO Gecko commercial, which was suggested by New York Governor David Paterson, Gekko says "even a caveman could do it" in the movie. At the request of Mulligan and LaBeouf, the filmmaker cut some dialogue from the character's break-up scenes, which he at first was initially hesitant to do.

Stone said that the film will provide more of a social commentary and admitted that he had never expected high finance to "serve again as a tableau for his storytelling". He also added that its plot will showcase the unemployment rate at an all-time high and the "our national debt ever climbing." Discussing the difference between Wall Street and its sequel, the director explained, "In the other movie, Charlie Sheen is corrupt at the beginning and he finds a path to integrity. In this movie, it starts out the other way. Shia and Carey are idealists. And their idealism is being threatened." A writer for USA Today believed that the film's story line "attempts to put the complicated financial schemes that led to the worldwide economic collapse on a human scale."

Filming 

A shift in location in the sequel reflected some of the changes in the world since then: while the New York Stock Exchange and its trading floor had featured heavily in the first film, they are less prominent in the second. Instead, more time is spent at the Federal Reserve Building, reflecting its new position as a "bulwark of the system" according to Stone. The location provided a link to the contemporary crisis the film examines, since September 2008 it has been an important site for meeting on the crisis.

Although August 10 was reportedly the start date, principal photography began on September 9. The filmmaker continued to make additions to the script and meet with financial consultants about the project whilst filming. Mulligan was able to film all of her scenes in 15 days. Stone said that they were on schedule and on budget, but claimed that the constantly changing weather was a problem for filming. He also said that the filming on location process was similar to the first film. While filming, LaBeouf said that Douglas was an "opened wound on the set" due to his oldest son's arrest in July for drug trafficking, adding that Stone filmed a "struggling" Douglas.

Charlie Sheen was able to shoot his scene in one day and described being on set with the director and Douglas as strange, with Stone adding that it was difficult for the actor. Sheen reportedly had trouble remembering his lines and required some prodding to remember his cue during the party scene in which Gekko encounters Fox. Although eager to meet him, LaBeouf did not interact with Sheen on set per request. Regarding working with the director, who has a reputation for being demanding on his cast, Douglas described him as being mellow, but acknowledged that "it's still always a workout with him." "Everyone was very friendly, but the scene work felt dangerous," LaBeouf recalls of the on-set atmosphere. "These guys aren't going to coddle you. Douglas was the one who comforted me. And I've never gone deeper with a director than Oliver. He's the Easter bunny and Orson Welles in one man." The young actor further discussed Stone's work ethic on-set with him, saying:

Douglas filmed the opening scene, which is Gekko being released from Sing Sing maximum-security prison, in Ossining, Westchester County, on September 18. Stone felt that the prison scene was a "key plot element" because there is no one there to meet Gekko, who returns to society as an outsider. Regarding there being no scenes that show Gekko adjusting to the modern world, the director clarified that there is "very little space to do those kind of tricks in this movie" because of how modern the world is becoming on a monthly basis. Filming took place in Fordham University for the classroom scenes on October 10 and 11. In order to shoot a dining scene between LaBeouf and Douglas, Shun Lee West closed for 24 hours so the two could film scenes at the restaurant for the entire day of November 10. Brolin and Stone found extras simply by asking workers, at places like RdV, if they would like to be a part of the sequel.

Soundtrack 

The soundtrack to the film was released on September 21, 2010, through Todo Mundo. The album features numerous songs by David Byrne, including several tracks from his 2008 collaboration with Brian Eno, Everything That Happens Will Happen Today.

Track listing 
 "Prison" (Craig Armstrong)
 "Home" (David Byrne and Brian Eno)
 "Life Is Long" (David Byrne and Brian Eno)
 "Sleeping Up" (David Byrne)
 "Strange Overtones" (David Byrne and Brian Eno)
 "Money" (Craig Armstrong)
 "My Big Nurse" (David Byrne and Brian Eno)
 "Helicopter Reveal" (Craig Armstrong)
 "Tiny Apocalypse" (David Byrne)
 "Lazy" (David Byrne)
 "I Feel My Stuff" (David Byrne and Brian Eno)
 "This Must Be the Place (Naïve Melody)" (Talking Heads)
 "Dekha" (ft. song by Ali Zafar)

Release

Marketing 

The film was screened out of competition during May 2010 at the Cannes Film Festival in France. Pressman thought that Cannes would be the "perfect platform to launch a film that speaks of today's economic dilemma". It was met with positive reviews from film critics at the festival, although numerous reviewers "objected to an ending deemed somewhat pat". A spokesperson for Fox said that Stone had changed the ending since its screening at Cannes. Wall Street: Money Never Sleeps opened The Ischia Global Film and Music Fest, held during July 11–18. Michael Corkery of The Wall Street Journal reported that numerous journalists involved in the financial industry had been invited to see advance screenings of the film. To promote Wall Street: Money Never Sleeps, several cast members visited the NASDAQ Market site in Times Square, on September 20 and presided over the NASDAQ Opening Bell.

Also on September 20, the movie's New York premiere was held at the Ziegfeld Theater in midtown Manhattan. According to Deadline Hollywood the film originally had a February 2010 release date, but it was later given an April 23, 2010, release. In March 2010, the film's release date was pushed back to September 24. Brolin stated that he hoped that audiences would wonder about the ethics of the banking industry, asking "How much is enough?," he concluded, "There used to be a ceiling. Now there's no ceiling". Surveys indicated that the main audience for the movie would be older adults who remembered the first film.

Box office 
Money Never Sleeps opened at a total of 3,597 theaters in the United States, earning $6.9 million on its first day and $19 million in its opening weekend in the US, averaging $5,330 per theatre and becoming the number one movie at the box office, although falling short of studio estimates. Nonetheless it still marked one of the best openings for a Stone film. Despite an increase of screens for its second weekend, Money Never Sleeps saw a 47% decrease on its earnings, falling to third place at the box office and making slightly over $10 million for the weekend.

During the October 8–10 weekend it had a further decrease, falling almost 55%, earning over $4 million and dropping to seventh place at the box office. In its fourth week of domestic release it fell under the top ten at the box office with a revenue of more than $1 million, after suffering a 48% decrease. Domestically, the film made $52.4 million, and has grossed over $134.7 million worldwide.

Reception
The film's reception was mixed. Review tallying website Rotten Tomatoes reported an approval rating of 55%, based on a sample of 234 reviews, with an average rating of 5.97/10. The website's critical consensus reads, "It's more entertaining than many sequels, but with Oliver Stone directing, a terrific cast, and a timely storyline that picks up where the original left off, Wall Street: Money Never Sleeps should be better." By comparison, Wall Street (1987) had achieved a 79% positive rating. On Metacritic, the film has a weighted average score of 59 out of 100, based on 39 critics, indicating "mixed or average reviews".

Joe Neumaier of the New York Daily News awarded it five out of five stars saying that it is a sharp sequel that is worthy of its investment. He also saluted the cast's performance and noted that Douglas gives Gekko "uncounted layers as he fakes, deals and fuels fire". Matthew Toomey of Australia's 612 ABC Radio Brisbane gave it a B-rating and said that Douglas is the film's "biggest positive", finding LaBeouf to be unconvincing in his role. Christy Lemire, in The Canadian Press, claimed that the film ultimately "goes soft and loses its way" and described the contrast in its final scenes as being "laughable". Furthermore, the subplot between LaBeouf and Mulligan's characters was criticized as unneeded and pointed out that their relationship leads viewers to wonder why Winnie, who despises Gekko, would be involved with a man who does exactly the same thing as him, which she condemns; however, Lemire acknowledged that the movie is an uncommon sequel that seems to be both relevant and necessary and said that it proves that "greed can still be good". Film critic Colin Newton of the Brisbane Sunday Mail felt that the plot lacked the enthusiasm of the first film. Along the same lines, Village Voice contributor Nick Pinkerton pointed out that the Wall Street sequel did not have the "clean, fable-like arc" formula of its predecessor.

Kirk Honeycutt of The Hollywood Reporter said that the film succeeded in being one of the good sequels in a while, but that Stone "gets too fancy here and there", the film's "heavy reliance on multiple screens, graphics and digital tricks makes it feel like one is watching CNN with all its computer-screen busyness." Roger Ebert, reviewing the movie in the Chicago Sun-Times, noted that it ended with a better conclusion when Stone had edited the film after its Cannes viewing, but still felt it was a little too long. He considered the film to be sophisticated and said its photography was aesthetically pleasing but stated he wanted it to be "outraged." In The Guardian Peter Bradshaw gave the film two out of five stars, commenting that "despite the pious waffle about market craziness being like cancer, no one is ever shown enduring the actual misery of losing money." Writing for Time magazine, Richard Corliss stated that the film has the "drive, luxe and sarcastic wit of the snazziest Hollywood movies." David Edelstein, writing in New York Magazine, described the film as being "full of promise, with minuscule returns." He concluded that, like Stone's other recent work, it is difficult to distinguish what the project's focus is supposed to be.

Joe Morgenstern from The Wall Street Journal wrote that the movie manages to keep a hold on its audience's attention. He thought that Douglas measured up to Gekko's standards in the film, believing that he was the only actor to sustain a "sense of nasty fun", and felt that LaBeouf's effectiveness was within the range of the film-maker's direction, but was unimpressed with Brolin's portrayal of James. He concluded that the script takes an unconvincing jab at Gekko's "spiritual regeneration," which was due to a scene that he considered to be "inherently illogical and emotionally inert." The Daily Telegraphs David Gritten said that Wall Street: Money Never Sleeps lacked the "punch" of the original film and was annoyed by the number of cameos throughout the film. Wall Street: Money Never Sleeps received three out of five stars from Stephen Lambrechts of IGN Australia. Lambrechts felt that Stone's growth as a film director might mirror Gekko's as a person; having had used time to calm down over the years and settle into a more relaxed state of being. He concluded that the film's final result is not "quite the incendiary attack that it could have been, but it still has plenty to say while also managing to be an entertaining crowd pleaser."

In contrast to the film's detractors, BoxOffice journalist Pete Hammond said the film was "brilliantly cast" and labeled it a "crackerjack powerhouse of a movie that shines a light on the financial machinations". He stated that Douglas does not lose any of the substance of Gekko and LaBeouf is firm as Jacob. The writer predicted the Wall Street sequel's box office performance would be brisk, while the prospects were assured on DVD. Andrew O'Hehir's of Salon.com reviewed the film from Cannes, calling it an "ambitious, uneven, surprisingly talky melodrama, which mixes a quasi-documentary approach to the crash of 2008 with the story." O'Hehir's considered the film to express a more "personal, intimate sense of moral hazard". Marshall Fine, writing in the Huffington Post, viewed the film as an "overstuffed blend of agitprop and melodrama" that contains a cautionary story pertaining to unchecked capitalism. He considered Stone to be proclaiming a message of the "cancerous effects of greed". Bill Goodykoontz of Arizona Republic admitted that he was not surprised to see that the sequel is not as effective as its predecessor, though it was an engaging film at the top of its game when it is hostile, and less satisfying during romantic parts. He ended by saying that it is not a "great movie", but explained that it is an "effective commentary on what greed cost" everyone. CEO of Tullett Prebon, Terry Smith, one of the largest inter-dealer money brokers in the world, reviewed the movie for Today on BBC Radio 4. He gave it three out of five saying that, although it was "a little bit corny in some respects", it puts the events of the credit crunch into context and that "it rings reasonably true," capturing some of the activities, the moods and the individuals quite well."

Accolades

Home media 
Wall Street: Money Never Sleeps was released on DVD and Blu-ray on December 21, 2010, in the US. Since then it has made more than $15.5 million in DVD sales revenue, selling more than 983,000 units.

See also 

 2010 in film
 Cinema of the United States
 List of American films of 2010

References

Notes

External links

 
 
 

2010s business films
2010 drama films
2010 films
20th Century Fox films
American business films
American drama films
American sequel films
Dune Entertainment films
Films scored by Craig Armstrong (composer)
Films about financial crises
Films directed by Oliver Stone
Films set in 2001
Films set in 2008
Films set in 2010
Films set in New York City
Films set in the Great Recession
Films shot in Dubai
Films shot in New Jersey
Films shot in New York City
Trading films
Wall Street films
Films with screenplays by Allan Loeb
2010s English-language films
2010s American films